Bit rot may refer to:

 "Bit Rot", a short story by Charles Stross
 Data rot, the decay of electromagnetic charge in a computer's storage
 Disc rot, the deterioration of optical media such as DVDs and CDs
 Software rot, the deterioration of unmaintained software